{|
{{Infobox ship image
|Ship image=Action between HMS Lion and Elizabeth and the Du Teillay, 9 July 1745 BHC0364.jpg
|Ship caption=Action between HMS Lion and Elizabeth and the Du Teillay, 9 July 1745, painting by Dominic Serres
}}

|}Du Teillay was a French privateer ship, commissioned as such in Nantes in 1744 by Antoine Walsh (1703–1763), a shipowner of Irish descent born in Saint-Malo and slave trader operating from Nantes in the south of Brittany. She played a central role in the Jacobite rising of 1745, ferrying Charles Edward Stuart to Loch Nan Uamh with supplies and funds to support his cause. 

Career

She saw action on the 9 July 1745 (according to the old style date, or 20 July 1745 according to the act of 1750 adopting the new Gregorian calendar), when she accompanied by the ship ‘Elizabeth’ (L'Elisabeth) she was fired upon by HMS Lion. The Du Teillay at the time was carrying Charles to Scotland. Prince Charles had boarded the French ship on 2 July 1745 (New style date) and left Saint-Nazaire on the 3 July 1745 (New style date) bound for Loch Nan Uamh. They were joined by a French escort ship the ‘Elizabeth’ on the island of Belle-Ile of the south-west coast of Brittany, but not until the 13 July 1745 (new style date). The ships departed from Belle-Ile on the 15th of July 1745 (new style date). A few days later, they were intercepted by the ‘Lion’, commanded by Captain Piercy Brett off the West coast of Brittany, south of Cape Lizard. A close action began at 17.00 between the ‘Lion’ and ‘Elizabeth’, with the ‘Du Teillay’ attacking the ‘Lion’ several times and, at 18.00, the ‘Lion’s’ mizzen topmast came down. By 20.00, The ‘Lion’ with her mizzen top and topmast shot away and hanging over the side was still in close action with the ‘Elizabeth’. The ‘Du Teillay’ shielded by the 'Elizabeth' continued firing at the ‘Lion’ who returned fire with her stern guns. The ‘Lion’ continued firing at the ‘Elizabeth’ until the latter broke free at 22.00 to join the ‘Du Teillay’; by this time the ‘Lion’ was too damaged to follow, with 52 of her men were dead and about 110 wounded. The ‘Elizabeth’ had lost about 57 men with 175 wounded with her commander, Captain Pierre Dehau and his brother Charles, among the dead, obliging the ship's second captain Pierre-Jean Bart to give up and return to Brest for repairs, leaving the Du Teillay'' to proceed alone.

On 23 July 1745 (old style date) i.e. 2nd of August 1745 (new style date), the 'Du Teillay' arrived at Eriskay in the Outer Hebrides with his 'seven men of Moidart', before sailing onto Loch nan Uamh where Charles landed two days later at Borrodale to meet the Laird Angus McDonald of Clanranald. The ship then sailed to the head of Lochailort and, from the 10th of August 1745 (N.S.) onwards, i.e. the 30th of July 1745 (O.S.), the ship's captain gave the order to unload its cargo of weapons, ammunitions and supplies. The ship then returned to Loch Nan Uamh on the 6th of August 1745 (O.S.). The ship owner's, Antoine Walsh, receives letters from the hands of the Prince on the 7th of August 1745 (O.S.). The ship left Charles in Borrodale, before continuing its journey on the 8th of August 1745 (O.S.) around the north of Scotland to the continent. The ship reached the bay of Pampus, on the east of Amsterdam, on the 3rd of September 1745 (N.S.) before Antoine Walsh sent orders for the ship to be sold. The Du Teillay sailed in Amsterdam under the Dutch flag on the 16th of September 1745 (N.S.) i.e. on the 5th of September 1745 (O.S.).

Fate

Notes and references
Notes

Citations

References
 

1744 ships
Maritime incidents in 1745
Privateer ships of France